Ciervo Nara Merida Cycling Team is a Japanese cycling team established in 2010.
It was registered as UCI Continental in 2013–2014.

References

UCI Continental Teams (Asia)
Cycling teams established in 2013
Cycling teams based in Japan
2013 establishments in Japan